The 2011 Rally Scotland, officially the RAC MSA Rally of Scotland, was the tenth round of the 2011 Intercontinental Rally Challenge (IRC) season. The fifteen stage gravel rally took place over 7–9 October 2011 with three stages run after sunset.

The rally offered points-and-a-half towards the respective IRC championships, meaning that the overall rally winner, as well as class winners, gained 37.5 points instead of the usual 25.

Introduction
The rally, which was run for the third time, was based in Perth, with a ceremonial start held at Stirling Castle on the Friday. Two runs of the Carron Valley stage completed the timetable for Friday. On Saturday six stages covering  were run on gravel with the final seven stages, consisting of  being completed on the Sunday.

Results
Andreas Mikkelsen took his first IRC victory on the event, becoming the youngest driver to win in the championship, having taken the lead on the second leg after an error by Guy Wilks.

Overall

Special stages

References

External links 
 The official website for the rally
 The official website of the Intercontinental Rally Challenge

Scotland
Rally
Rally Scotland
Rally Scotland